Bombscare is an EP by Low and Spring Heel Jack. It was released in 2000 by Tugboat Records.

Track listing
"Bombscare" – 4:31
"Hand So Small" – 3:38
"So Easy (So Far)" – 3:52
"Way Behind" – 4:59

References

2000 EPs
Low (band) EPs